The  Arizona Rattlers season marked the 1st season for the franchise. The Rattlers sold out every home during the season.

Regular season

Schedule

Standings

z – clinched homefield advantage

y – clinched division title

x – clinched playoff spot

Roster

External links
1992 Arizona Rattlers on ArenaFan.com

Arizona Rattlers seasons
Arizona Rattlers
Arizona Rattlers
20th century in Phoenix, Arizona